John Ratcliffe or possibly Radcliffe (1700 – 1775) was Master of Pembroke College, Oxford.

Education
Son of clergyman, Robert Ratcliffe, he was educated at John Roysse's Free School in Abingdon, (now Abingdon School).

He earned a B.A (1722) and M.A (1725) at Pembroke. B.D. (1737) and Doctor of Divinity (D.D.) 1739.

Career
John Ratcliffe became Master of Pembroke on 23 February 1738.

The close relationship between Abingdon School and Pembroke College resulted in seven Old Abingdonians being appointed as consecutive masters at Pembroke between 1710 and 1843.  They were Colwell Brickenden 1709-1714; Matthew Panting, 1714-1738; Ratcliffe, 1738-1775; William Adams, 1775-1789; William Sergrove  1789-1796; John Smyth, 1796-1809 and George William Hall, 1809-1843.

He was rector of Coln Rogers (1739-1775) and canon of Gloucester (1739-1775).

He was a Steward of the OA Club in 1747.

See also
 List of Old Abingdonians
 List of Pembroke College, Oxford, people

References

1700 births
1775 deaths
Masters of Pembroke College, Oxford
People educated at Abingdon School